Norsk was the brand name of cars built by Norsk Automobil & Vagnfabrik AS in Oslo, Norway between 1908 and 1911. Models produced included a small automobile with a single-cylinder 8 hp engine and a heavier touring car with 4-cylinder engine. A total of around 10 cars were built.

Sources 
David Burgess Wise, The New Illustrated Encyclopedia of Automobiles, Quarto, London (1979)

External links
 http://www.gtue-oldtimerservice.de

Car manufacturers of Norway
1900s cars